Lansdowne is a suburb of Bournemouth.  It occupies the north-east part of the main built-up area around Bournemouth Town Centre.

History
Bournemouth and Poole College has its largest campus here, the college was originally the Bournemouth Municipal College which opened in 1913. It is a listed building and is known for its clock tower (said to be an 'eyesore' when first built). A public library was part of the building until 2002. A small number of 'Horsa huts' were built in the 1940s and a large three-floor extension opened in 1957. In 1960 it took over the former Bournemouth School for Girls buildings which were two old Victorian houses (Ascham House [listed building] and Woodcote) which were used as the school when it opened in 1917.

On 3 May 1961 The Downstairs Club, Bournemouth's first full-time rock and jazz club, opened in Holdenhurst road just off Lansdowne roundabout.

References

Areas of Bournemouth